Parel Vallei is an affluent suburb of Somerset West in the Western Cape, South Africa. There is a high school, Parel Vallei High School.

There is a section of upper Parel Vallei road that is known as Spook Hill. On this section of the road it appears as if a short section of relatively flat downhill slope is uphill slope due to the contrast with the steeper sections above and below. It is an optical illusion best viewed in front of Straightway Head Country House, at the top of the Parel Vallei Road.

Somerset West